The men's 10 metre air rifle event at the 2018 Asian Games in Palembang, Indonesia took place on 20 August at the Jakabaring International Shooting Range.

Schedule
All times are Western Indonesia Time (UTC+07:00)

Records

Results

Qualification

Final

References

Results

External links
Schedule

Men's 10 metre air rifle